The Course of Honour is a historical novel by  Lindsey Davis, set in ancient Rome and concerning the emperor Vespasian and his lover Caenis. It was the first novel Davis wrote which was set in ancient Rome, but was not published until 1997 after she had become known for the Falco series. Davis has said "I see it as my first real book, and because the true story is so wonderful, it will always be my favourite."

Translations
The book has been translated into Spanish by Alberto Coscarelli, and published by Edhasa as La carrera del honor: Caenis y Vespasiano.  It has also been translated into Italian by Maria Elena Vaccarini, and published by Marco Tropea Editore as La forza dell'onore.

The first American edition (1998 Mysterious Press ) was published with the American English spelling The Course of Honor.  The current United States edition (2009, St. Martin's Griffin) carries the original title.

References

External links
 UK publisher's website, including sample pages.
 US publisher's website  

British historical novels
Novels set in ancient Rome
Novels by Lindsey Davis
Novels set in the 1st century
1997 British novels
Century (imprint) books